Ignatius Michael "Michal" Groenewald is a South African politician serving as a Member of the National Assembly of South Africa. A member of the Freedom Front Plus (FF+), he is the party's provincial leader in the North West. Groenewald serves alongside his father and party leader, Pieter Groenewald, in Parliament. He was previously a municipal councillor in the Matlosana Local Municipality.

References

External links
Mr Ignatius Michael Groenewald – Parliament of South Africa
Ignatius Michael Groenewald – People's Assembly

Living people
Afrikaner people
Members of the National Assembly of South Africa
Freedom Front Plus politicians
Year of birth missing (living people)